Classicnl (formerly known as Classic FM) is a classical music radio station in the Netherlands, which at one time broadcast on FM, but is now available nationally on DAB+, cable and internationally on the Internet. The station is owned by the Bakker Oosterbeek Beheer BV which acquired the station from Telegraaf Media Groep which owned the radio station from 2006 until November 2017. The radio station was known as Classic FM from 1994 until 1 October 2019.

It transmits classical music 24 hours a day with no presenters. During the years 1994-1997 the format was almost identical to the Classic FM (UK) station, including the 'jingles', except with Dutch presentation. News is broadcast or streamed on the hour. The live stream is available on their website: https://www.classic.nl/

History
At the end of January 1994 there was a redistribution of FM terrestrial frequencies place. This happened on substantive grounds. It was to divide one frequency package for jazz and classical music. The preference of the Ministerie van Welzijn, Volksgezondheid en Cultuur (English: Ministry of Welfare, Health and Culture) was for EuroJazz (later called Jazz Radio), this station could not afford it financially. Classic FM (UK) also commanded the frequency package. After negotiations between the ministry and the British package was allotted to Classic FM on the condition that 40% jazz would be broadcast. On 30 April 1994 the Dutch Classic FM was founded and broadcasts commenced.

In 1997, following a complaint from Sky Radio and Radio 538, the court ruled on the frequency allocation in 1994. Part of the decision was to lift the obligation for Classic FM to broadcast jazz and classical music. Shortly after this verdict Sky Radio took over the station and since then only light classical music can be heard on Classic FM. Sky Radio then sold Classic FM to the Telegraaf Media Group.

On 1 April 2000 the ailing competitor Concertradio was incorporated, making Classic FM the only classical, private radio station in the Netherlands.

In 2009, the fifteenth anniversary was celebrated with special broadcasts, a sold-out concert in the Amsterdam Concertgebouw and a special CD.

During the redistribution of FM terrestrial frequencies in 2003, the station didn't obtain an ether frequency, because its owner Sky Radio Group already owned frequencies for Sky Radio and Radio Veronica.

In the period July to August 2018, Classic FM (Netherlands) had a radio market share of 1.3% (the state financed classical music radio station Radio 4 had 2.1%) 

In November 2017, investor Ids Bakker of Bakker Oosterbeek Beheer acquired the station from Telegraaf Media Group and decided to discontinue broadcasting on the DAB+ frequency due to few listeners. Bakker Oosterbeek Beheer also owns labels for classical and jazz music under the name Challenge Records and operates classical streaming services under the name MeloMe.

In October 2019, Bakker Oosterbeek Beheer decided to terminate the 1994 licence agreement with the owners of Classic FM (UK) - British Global Media & Entertainment - and to rename the station Classicnl, because it hadn't used an FM frequency since 2003. Both agreed that the Classic FM brand cannot be used in the Netherlands in the coming years.

The station was commissioned to attract a younger audience by playing shorter pieces of classical music during the day and complete classical works at night. In addition to cable TV and Internet, the station returned to DAB+.

See also
 List of radio stations in the Netherlands

References

External links
Classicnl website

Radio stations in the Netherlands
Mass media in Naarden